A by-election was held for the New South Wales Legislative Assembly electorate of Tamworth in June 1889 because of the resignation of Robert Levien. The Supreme Court had found Levien guilty of the dishonourable conduct of permitting his unqualified clerk to have acted as an attorney, fined him  £100 and suspended him from practice for twelve months.

Dates

Results

				
Robert Levien resigned because the Supreme Court had found him guilty of dishonourable conduct.

See also
Electoral results for the district of Tamworth
List of New South Wales state by-elections

References

1889 elections in Australia
New South Wales state by-elections
1890s in New South Wales